Charles Daniel Hockin Brusquetti (born 4 November 1989) is a Paraguayan swimmer. He competed in the men's 50 metre backstroke event at the 2017 World Aquatics Championships.

References

External links
 

1989 births
Living people
Paraguayan male swimmers
Place of birth missing (living people)
South American Games bronze medalists for Paraguay
South American Games medalists in swimming
Competitors at the 2010 South American Games
Competitors at the 2014 South American Games
Competitors at the 2018 South American Games
Competitors at the 2022 South American Games
Swimmers at the 2011 Pan American Games
Swimmers at the 2015 Pan American Games
Swimmers at the 2019 Pan American Games
Competitors at the 2017 Summer Universiade
Male backstroke swimmers
Male butterfly swimmers
Male freestyle swimmers
Pan American Games competitors for Paraguay
Loughborough University athletes
21st-century Paraguayan people